Wolfram Steinwendtner is an Austrian retired slalom canoeist who competed in the mid-1950s. He won a bronze medal in the C-2 team event at the 1955 ICF Canoe Slalom World Championships in Tacen.

References

Austrian male canoeists
Possibly living people
Year of birth missing
Medalists at the ICF Canoe Slalom World Championships